The Williamstown Cricket Ground, currently known by its sponsored name Downer Oval, and also informally as Point Gellibrand Oval, is a football and cricket stadium located in Williamstown, Victoria. The ground is located on Point Gellibrand, the southernmost point of Williamstown which juts into Port Phillip Bay. The ground is currently the home of the Williamstown Football Club in the Victorian Football League, and the Williamstown Cricket Club in the Victorian Sub-District Cricket Association.

History
The ground was established as early as the 1850s as a venue for cricket in Williamstown, and for the Williamstown Cricket Club which formed around the same time.

Senior football was not played regularly at the Williamstown Cricket Ground until 1886. The Williamstown Football Club was unable to agree to terms with the cricket club for use of the ground, forcing the football club to play its matches without charging for admission at the unfenced Gardens Reserve; as a direct result of this dispute, a new senior football club, the South Williamstown Football Club, was established, and received permission to play its matches at the cricket ground. In 1888, the dispute ended; the two football clubs amalgamated, and began playing all of its home games at the ground with the agreement of the cricket club.

One major grandstand, the W. L. Floyd Pavilion, was built during the 20th century, and is located on the south-western flank. It was initially opened in 1930, and in 1963 it was named after Larry Floyd, who served as club secretary in the 1930s and 1940s. The ground's location at Point Gellibrand, jutting slightly out into Port Phillip Bay, makes the seaside ground picturesque, but also heavily windswept, often affecting play during football games and making for cold conditions during winter.

The venue was redeveloped between 2010 and 2012, which included refurbishing the Floyd Pavilion. A Crimean War era military bunker was unexpectedly uncovered beneath the outer during the redevelopment work.

References

Sports venues in Melbourne
Cricket grounds in Victoria (Australia)
Victorian Football League grounds
Williamstown, Victoria
Sport in the City of Hobsons Bay
Buildings and structures in the City of Hobsons Bay